The women's shot put event  at the 1973 European Athletics Indoor Championships was held on 10 March in Rotterdam.

Results

References

Shot put at the European Athletics Indoor Championships
Shot